Science fiction, fantasy and horror are literary genres found in Ukrainian literature and media, written in both Ukrainian and Russian. The most influential classic writer of Ukrainian science fiction is Oles Berdnyk.

Language and culture 
For most of the 20th century, Ukraine was part of the Soviet Union, and before that, the Russian Empire, where Russian language was dominant. Although Ukrainian is now the official language of independent Ukraine, many Ukrainian authors speak and write in Russian, which also allows them access to a larger market. Writing in Ukrainian is, however, becoming increasingly common in the 21st century, also in part due to tensions and conflicts between Ukraine and Russia. Because of that complex history, some writers born in territories of modern Ukraine are not usually considered Ukrainian; for example, Mikhail Bulgakov is commonly described as Russian, and Stanisław Lem as Polish, though both were born in Lviv, Ukraine. Likewise, Nikolai Gogol, one of the originators of Russian fantasy, has Ukrainian origins and often used Ukrainian folk motifs in his works. For these reasons, while Ukrainian literature, including fantasy and science fiction, is increasingly distinctive, traditionally it has close ties with, and has often been analyzed in the context of, the Russian literary tradition. 

Some works are also written in other languages, including English, by Ukrainian emigree writers, such as R. B. Lemberg and Anatoly Belilovsky.

History 

As in many other countries, the history of Ukrainian science fiction and fantasy goes back to the beginning of the 20th century, although it draws inspirations from earlier works. Among those are magic motifs in the poetry of the 19th-century Ukrainian poet Lesya Ukrainka or works of Gogol. Over the next century, Ukrainian works would be inspired both by the Russian and Western science fiction and fantasy literature.

Krat's works represent utopian social science fiction, whereas Berezhnyi's is the more traditional, adventure- and science-focused classic science fiction-type of literature.

Modern popular Ukrainian science fiction and fantasy writers include Volodymyr Arenev, Maryna and Serhiy Dyachenko,  Max Frei, H.L. Oldie, Volodymyr Savchenko,  and Andriy Valentynov. One of the most controversial writers is Fyodor Berezin, a writer born in the disputed Donetsk territory and associated with the Donetsk People's Republic, whose military science fiction represents an extreme pro-Russian viewpoint.

Themes and genres 
Traditionally, science fiction was much more popular in Ukrainian literature than fantasy, but that began to change in the recent decades. The first anthology of Ukrainian fantasy stories was published in 1990 (Ohnenyi zmii, The Fiery Dragon), and the first anthology of horror stories in 2000 (Antolohiia ukrainskoho zhakhu, The Anthology of Ukrainian Horror Fiction); the latter was soon followed by another anthology in 2001 (Nichnyi pryvyd: antolohiia ukrainskoi hotychnoi prozy XIX stolittia, A Night Spectre: the Anthology of Ukrainian Gothic Prose from the 19th Century). 

According to Smyrniw, major themes of the 20th century Ukrainian science fiction include space travel, time travel, alien con­tact, robots, androids, and cyborgs.

Fandom 
Fantasy and science fiction fandom in Ukraine has been described as strong, as evidenced by the fact that Kiev has been a host of the Eurocon twice (in 2006 and 2013).

Reception 
Like Russian, Ukrainian science fiction and fantasy is popular in Poland. Among the most popular Ukrainian science fiction and fantasy writers in Poland and Russian-speaking countries are Maryna and Serhiy Dyachenko. Ukrainian works are sometimes translated to English, although this not very common.

Ukrainian fantasy and science fiction have been subject to a 2013 monograph by Wal­ter Smyrniw (Ukrainian Science Fiction: Historical and Thematic Perspectives).

References 

Ukrainian science fiction
Ukrainian fantasy
Soviet science fiction